Bongjuknori [kor: 봉죽놀이] is a traditional Korean game played for a big catch in fishing villages on the 14th day of the New Year. It is a collective dance game that is woven with sound and dance while praying for a big catch in fishing villages.

On the morning of the 14th day of the New Year, sailors gather at the playground. When the drummer and the Gugwari catch the beat, the leader stands in the middle and makes a sound, signalling the sailors to also exchange sounds. People dance with excitement as the sound of the song and the rhythm of the choruses harmonize. After resting for a while, people perform various songs, as well as  dance and bracken dance.

Bongjuknori usually lasts about a week. In Hwanghae-do and some areas of Gyeonggi-do, catching a lot of fish indicates that they have received 'bongjuk'. It is widely practised in Pyeongan-do, Hwanghae-do, Gyeonggi-do, Yeonpyeong-do, Cheonsu-man, and Anmyeon-do.

This game is deeply related to early catching on the west coast. The purpose of the game is to pray before the god General Im Gyeong-eop, keeping the boat safe and that it catches a lot of fish so that everyone can enjoy a big catch.

Bonjuk 
'Bongjuk' refers to a flag wrapped in straw in the middle of a long bamboo pole, and a paper flower and five-coloured flags. The flag prepared before commencing the fishing expedition is a 2 — 3-meter-long bamboo pole, split into several parts and decorated with artificial flowers. To make a bongjuk, using bamboo, straw, and paper, or clothes requires ten to twenty people.

Origin 
‘Bonjuknori’ and its dance inspired by the seaside people and their livelihood have different names in different regions. It is said to have originated from the superstitious custom of keeping virgins in the sea. This was done under the excuse of guaranteeing the safety and prosperity of sailing as a business through the sea roads in the past. The sea spirit received a maiden as an offering every year, which in modern times have been replaced by a scarecrow nowadays and is stored in seawater.

The origin and history of Bongjuk Nori also have a very strong tie with croaker fishing. Boats with a bongjuk were often witnessed during the croaker season. The ships that caught an abundance of croakers used to return to a port with a hoisted bongjuk while playing instruments. The height of the flag could indicate the catch of the day. When the flag hung high, the haul was of a little amount, while the flag's lower positioning would indicate a more successful catch.

Rituals 
Bongjuk Nori has mainly two ritualistic elements which have been passed on primarily in the west coast region, depending upon the timing of the performance. One of the rituals involves people rejoicing and playing instruments when a boat with bountiful fish returns to the port. The other involves people participating in this tradition relating to the other rituals of the village. The latter of the two has been passed on predominantly through generations.

As per common belief, the dance musters courage and boldness within the fishermen. Villages of Hwangdo, in Chungcheongnam- do Province, gather together under their dangsan tree (sacred guardian tree) to hold a ritual on the 15th of the first lunar month. They wish for a rich harvest and an abundant haul of fish. In general, the Bongjuk Nori is a custom blending dancing and singing with Bongjuk Taryeong as the main song.

During the Bongjuk Nori, all participants dance spontaneously along to the rhythm of the farmers' music as there is no definite form of the dance.

References 

Korean games
Asian games
Korean culture
Festivals in Korea
Festivals in South Korea
Lists of ancient festivals